Wuga Station is an elevated metro station in Ningbo, Zhejiang, China. Wuga Station situates in Daqi Subdistrict, on the north of planned Ningbo Container Hub Station. Construction of the station started in December 2012, and service began on March 19, 2016.

Exits 

Wuga Station has two exits.

References 

Railway stations in Zhejiang
Railway stations in China opened in 2016
Ningbo Rail Transit stations